Biocellata is a genus of moths in the family Cossidae.

Species
 Biocellata alfarae
 Biocellata bifida
 Biocellata bistellata
 Biocellata davisorum
 Biocellata ockendeni
 Biocellata praeclara
 Biocellata rotundipuncta

References

Natural History Museum Lepidoptera generic names catalog

Cossulinae
Cossidae genera